George Verney, 12th Baron Willoughby de Broke and de jure 20th Baron Latimer (13 October 1659 – 26 December 1728) was a peer in the English peerage.

George Verney was born on 13 October 1659, the second son of Richard Verney, 11th Baron Willoughby de Broke (1621–1711), and Mary Pretyman, daughter of Sir John Pretyman, at the Verney family seat at Compton Verney House in Warwickshire. He inherited the title 12th Baron Willoughby de Broke and 20th Baron Latimer on the death of his father in 1711, his elder brother John having died in 1707. He married Margaret Heath, daughter of Sir John Heath, on 2 December 1683. They had four children; Margaret, Thomas (died 1710), Richard and John.

He became a fellow of New College, Oxford, graduating M.A. in 1686 and D.D. in 1699. After serving as a canon of St George's Chapel, Windsor from 1701 to 1713 he was installed Dean of St Georges Chapel, Windsor in 1713, a position he held until his death. He also became registrar of the Order of the Garter in 1713.

He undertook extensive remodelling of Compton Verney House to give it a more classical appearance.

On his death on 26 December 1728 he was buried at Compton Verney and the title passed to his second son Richard, his eldest son having died.

References
 
 ThePeerage

External links
 Compton Verney House website

1659 births
1728 deaths
Fellows of New College, Oxford
Ordained peers
Canons of Windsor
Deans of Windsor
George
Registrars of the Order of the Garter
12